The Geneva tramway network is a network of tramways forming the core element of the public transport system in Geneva, Switzerland. It is operated by Transports Publics Genevois (TPG), and is supplemented by the Geneva trolleybus system and the Geneva bus system.

Opened in 1862, the network had grown sufficiently by 1920 to serve large parts of the surrounding countryside.  However, by 1960 it had contracted to just one line. Since 1995, it has been greatly expanded. It presently has five tram lines, and further expansions are planned. The network extends into France, with line 17 going to Annemasse.

History

Rise and fall (1862–1976) 

Geneva's and Switzerland's first trams ran on 19 June 1862, with the opening of a horsecar tramway between Place Neuve and Carouge. In 1889, a steam tramway was opened, and in 1894 Geneva's first electric tram entered service.  Finally, in 1899, the Compagnie Genevoise des Tramways Électriques (CGTE), predecessor of the TPG, was inaugurated.

The CGTE set itself the goal of unifying the various systems. All lines were electrified and  converted to a uniform metre gauge.

For nearly three months in 1904, the CGTE also operated the steepest adhesion railway in Switzerland. The incline reached 11.8%, but the dangers posed by such steep inclines brought about the swift demise of this line.

In the 1920s, the city and the canton had a large network of urban and suburban tramways. The network extended into the countryside, and even across the border into France.
 
In 1925, the CGTE began to convert its interurban lines to bus operation. This process continued in the city centre, where the lines were partly replaced by trolleybuses. The good technical condition of the tramcars and the fact that they had not yet been written off, led to the provisional retention of the last tramway.
 
In the 1970s, concepts were developed to connect the relatively large suburban communities of Meyrin and Onex to the remaining tramway once again, with an appropriately modern light railway.  However, all of these ideas, and also the investments necessary for the maintenance of the remaining infrastructure in the medium term, exceeded the abilities of the privately owned CGTE. A popular initiative demanding the nationalization of the CGTE was then adopted, and on 1 January 1977 the CGTE was transformed into the TPG, an autonomous government agency of the canton of Geneva.

Renaissance (1977–1992) 

In 1978, the tracks of the last remaining tramway were renewed under the auspices of the "new" TPG. Planning of the proposed new lines was addressed.  However, it was only on 12 June 1988, with the adoption of a new cantonal law about public transport, that the first concrete building proposals were presented.  From 1995, these proposals then became the basis of larger network extensions.
 
By that time, the most pressing modernisation of existing operations had already occurred. In 1984, in Bachet-de-Pesay in the municipality of Lancy, construction work had begun on the new Bachet tram depot. To connect the new facility with the existing network, the route of line 12 was extended on 27 September 1987 by one kilometre (0.6 mi) from Carouge to Bachet. The sidings and maintenance facility in Bachet were opened in 1988, and in 1990 the associated tram and trackwork construction workshop was commissioned.  Finally, in 1992, the new administration building was opened.  Since then, it has been the headquarters of the TPG.

In 1987–1989, the TPG procured a total of 45 new, partly low floor, articulated trams, based on the prototype Be 4/6 tram no. 741, which had joined the TPG fleet in 1984.  The new trams were supplied by Ateliers de Constructions Mécaniques de Vevey (ACMV) in Villeneuve, Vaud, in collaboration with Düwag and BBC / ABB. The colloquial expression "DAV", which is used to denote these vehicles, is an acronym for Düwag - Ateliers de Vevey. Following this new procurement, TPG's existing fleet of old trams could be completely withdrawn, as future network expansion, including the introduction of new lines 13 and 16, had already been taken into account when the order for the new trams was placed.

Network expansion (1992–2006) 

In 1988, a referendum on the proposed new network expansion projects was unsuccessful.  The first phase of development of the network therefore became the construction of a central Plainpalais–Carouge–Bachet–Palettes–Acacias–Plainpalais ring link, and the crossing of the Rhône to the Genève-Cornavin railway station, with a continuation to the Place des Nations and United Nations Office at Geneva.
 
On 28 May 1995, line 13 (Cornavin–Bachet) was opened, and trams returned to the other side of the Rhône. On 28 June 1997, line 13 was extended from Bachet to Palettes and on 28 March 1998, line 16 (Moillesulaz–Cornavin) was put into operation.  On 14 December 2003, line 13 was extended from Cornavin to Nations.

The following year, on 11 December 2004, line 15 entered service; it ran on a new route from Lancy-Pont-Rouge via Acacias to Plainpalais, and continued from there via Cornavin station to Nations.  From 10 December 2005, this new section was also served by line 17, which ran from Plainpalais to Eaux-Vives station.
 
Due to the increased need for rolling stock resulting from the network expansions after 2000, more trams were procured. Initially, the TPG ordered 21 Flexity Outlook Cityrunners from Bombardier Transportation for delivery in 2004-2005, with an option on another 17 vehicles; the option was exercised at the end of 2007.

On 13 May 2006, upon the entry into service of a new section between Palettes and Lancy-Pont-Rouge, the ring link was completed, and with it the first phase of the network's expansion. The new ring link section facilitated the extension of line 15 and line 17 to Palettes and Bachet, respectively. From the day the ring link was completed, the four tram lines operating on it, lines 12, 13, 15 and 17, no longer terminated there, but changed their numbers at designated stops: line 12 became line 17 at the Bachet stop, and line 13 became line 15 at the Palettes stop.  In 2009, there was another alteration in the way the lines serviced the ring link: line 12 began switching to line 15 at the Palettes stop, line 13 started to reverse at the Palettes loop and line 17 was redirected to turn around at the Lancy-Pont-Rouge loop.

TCMC and TCOB construction (2007–2011) 

The next network expansion phases included the Tram Cornavin–Meyrin–CERN (TCMC) project, the construction of which began in early 2006, and the Tram Cornavin–Onex–Bernex (TCOB), for which the Swiss Federal Council awarded the concession in January 2007.
 
The first section of the TCMC, between Cornavin and Avanchet, was opened on 8 December 2007.  Initially, it formed part of the extended line 16 (Moillesulaz–Avanchet) and the new line 14 (Bachet–Avanchet). On same date, line 17 was extended, from Eaux-Vives station to the disused Chêne-Bourg station, and thus revived scheduled services on the short local branch line, including its terminal loop, after a long absence.

The first TCMC section was built in a double track configuration.  However, the absence of any balloon loop at the provisional terminus at Avanchet, or at the permanent termini at Meyrin–Gravière and CERN, as well as the inclusion on this section of several stations with island platforms, made necessary the exclusive use of bidirectional vehicles to run services on the section.  As the numbers of the Flexity Outlook trams in the fleet were then rather limited, the TPG exercised its existing option for 17 more vehicles, while in the meantime the previous through-connection of line 12 with line 16 at the Moillesulaz terminus had to be suspended.
 
According to various sources, the opening of the second stage of the TCMC (Avanchet–Meyrin) took place on 12 December 2009, with the entry into service of the section to Meyrin (Gravière). On 30 April 2011, operations commenced on the section to CERN.

The TCOB route to Bernex P+R, which includes, amongst other things, a second crossing of the Rhône, went into service at the end of 2011. The first – very short – section of this route, between Coutance and Genève-Cornavin station, had already commenced operations at the timetable change in December 2010. A new line 18 ran on the route, and was extended to CERN in May 2011.

For the inauguration of the TCOB route, the TPG ordered 32 Tango trams, made by the Swiss company Stadler Rail. Like the Cityrunners, the Tango trams are bidirectional. 
 
After the new route to Bernex P+R was commissioned, the network was simplified. There are now only four tram lines, nos. 12, 14, 15 and 18. The use of the previous lines 13, 16 and 17 were discontinued, and only one line now operates on most section of track. Although these changes simplify tram operations, they also mean that points on the inner city sections, and in particular Genève-Cornavin station, can no longer be reached from all parts of the network (e.g. Genève-Cornavin is no longer directly served by line 12) without the need to change trams en route.

Lines 

Interchange stations, which enable transfers between the lines, are located at the following stops:
 Genève-Cornavin railway station
 Genève, Bel-Air
 Genève, Stand
 Genève, Plainpalais

Projects  
Two cross-border extensions are planned, one towards Saint-Julien-en-Genevois via Plan-les-Ouates, and the other an extension of line 17 towards Lycée des Glières in Annemasse.

An extension of line 15 is proposed between Place des Nations and Le Grand-Saconnex, with a possible extension to Ferney-Voltaire in France.  However, the realisation of this project would depend upon the construction of the new Route des Nations, a project the commencement of which is still uncertain.

Supercapacitor power supply 
The TPG has tested a supercapacitor power supply system on a Stadler Tango tram.  If such a system were found to be successful, it could be applied to the other 31 Tango trams 'relatively easily'.

Fleet

Heritage motor cars 
 Ce 4/4 66 (1901/1936) CGTE/SAAS, returned from AMITRAM (Lille), currently in restoration 
 Ce 4/4 67 (1901/1936) CGTE/SAAS
 Ce 2/2 80 (1901) Herbrandt, on loan from AMTUIR (Paris), not operational
 Ce 2/2 125 (1920) SIG/SAAS, on loan from Blonay–Chamby Museum Railway (BC)
 Ce 4/4 729 (1952) SWP/SAAS

Heritage trailer cars 
 Bi 363 (1919) SIG
 Bi 369 (1919) SIG, returned from AMTUIR (Paris), currently in restoration
 B 308 (1951) FFA
 M 410 (1913) SWS, box car bought from BVB with No. 204, currently in restoration as a CGTE freight car
 X 603, snow plough, not operational, stored outside the network

Current fleet

Network Map

See also

List of town tramway systems in Switzerland
Trolleybuses in Geneva

Notes

References

Inline references

Bibliography

External links

 Association genevoise du musée des Tramways – official site 
 
 

Geneva
Transport in Geneva
Tourist attractions in Geneva
Geneva, Trams in
600 V DC railway electrification
1862 establishments in Switzerland
Geneva
Cross-border rapid transit